The System Independent Data Format (SIDF) is a file system specification for removable media that was designed to achieve storage interoperability and to allow data interchange among software and hardware platforms.  The data format was originally developed in 1990 by Tom Bogart while at Novell. In 1992, the System Independent Data Format (SIDF) committee, an industry consortium, was formed by Tallgrass Technologies to enhance the format. The SIDF committee included most data backup and archival software vendors at the time. In 1993, the specification was submitted to ECMA and adopted as an international standard by ECMA in December, 1994.

See also 

 List of archive formats
 Comparison of archive formats

References

Computer file formats
Computer storage media
Ecma standards